Čokolada may refer to:

 Čokolada (album), 1983 album by the Serbian band Idoli
 Čokolada (song), 1983 song by the Serbian band Idoli